Order of battle for the Central Hubei Operation (November 25–30, 1940), a battle of the Second Sino-Japanese War.

Japan 

11th Army – Lt. General Waichiro Sonobe [5]
 Kayashima Force  – Lt. Gen Takashi Kayashima 1939–1941[4,5] at  Tang-yang
 18th Independent Mixed Brigade – Lt. Gen Taka Kayashima 1939–1941[4,5] 
 92nd Independent infantry battalion
 93rd Independent infantry battalion
 94th Independent infantry battalion
 95th Independent infantry battalion
 96th independent infantry battalion
 artillery troops
 labor troops 
 signal communication unit.
 Elements of the  40th Division  Lt-General Naojiro Amaya, Manchuria 10/2/39 – 8/25/1941 [1],[4,5]
 40th Infantry Brigade group: 
 234th Infantry regiment
 235th Infantry regiment 
 236th Infantry regiment
 40th Cavalry regiment
 40th mountain artillery regiment
 40th military engineer regiment
 40th Transport  regiment
  Murakami Force – Lt. Gen Keisaku Murakami4,5  at Chingmen
 39th Division – - Lt. Gen Keisaku Murakami [4,5] [1]
 39th Infantry Brigade Group
 231st Infantry Rregiments
 232nd Infantry Regiments
 233rd Infantry Regiments
 39th Recon Regiment
 39th Field Artillery Regiment
 39th Military Engineer Regiment
 39th Transport Regiment
 Hirabayashi Force – Lt-General Morito Hirabayashi at Chung-hsiang 
 Elements of 17th Division – Lt-General Morito Hirabayashi[4,5]  
 17th Infantry Brigade Group 
 53rd Infantry Regiment 
 54th Infantry Regiment 
 81st Infantry Regiment 
 23rd Field Artillery Regiment
 7th Military Engineer Regiment
 17th Transport Regiment
  Kurahashi Detachment – Col. Kurahashi 
 60th Infantry Regiment, detached from 15th Division in the Nanchang area.
 Kitano Force – Lt. Gen Kenzo Kitano [4,5], north of Chung-hsiang in the vicinity of modern Shuanghe
 Elements of 4th Division – Lt. Gen Kenzo Kitano [4,5]
 4th Infantry Brigade group:
 8th Infantry Regiment
 37th Infantry Regiment 
 61st Infantry Regiment 
 4th Recon Regiment 
 4th Field Artillery Regiment 
 4th Military Engineer Regiment
 4th Transport Regiment 
 Kususe Armored force – ?[1]
 7th Tank Regiment 
 13th Tank Regiment 
 ? Tank Regiment
 Teshima Force – Lt. General Fusataro Teshima [3], at  Sui Hsien 
 3rd Division – Lt. General Fusataro Teshima [1][3]
 5th Infantry Brigade
 6th Infantry Regiment
 68th Infantry Regiment
 29th Infantry Brigade
 18th Infantry Regiment
 34th Infantry Regiment
 3rd Field Artillery Regiment
 3rd Cavalry Regiment
 3rd Engineer Regiment
 3rd Transport Regiment

Notes
  15th Division – Lt-General Keiichi Kumagai 1940–1941[4,5]
 7th and 13th were two of three Tank regiments assigned to 11th Army in late 1940.

China 

5th War Area – Li Tsung-jen
 River West Group / 33rd Army Group – Feng Chih-an 
 77th Corps – Feng Chih-an (concurrent)
 37th Division – Li Chiu-sze
 179th Division – Liu Chen-shan
 30th Corps – Wang Chung-lien or Chih Feng-cheng
 27th Division – Hsu Wen-yao
 30th Division – Liu Chen-shan
 31st Division – ?
 Right Army Group / 29th Army Group – Wang Tsan-hsu  
 44th Corps – Liao Chen
 149th Division 
 150th Division
 67th  Corps – Hsu Shao-tsung
 161st Division 
 162nd Division
 Central Army Group / 22nd Army Group – Sun Chen 
 41st Corps – Chen Ting-hsun
 125th Division 
 127th Division
 45th Corps – Sun Chen
 122nd Division 
 124th Division
59th Corps- Huang Wei-kang [moved to Hsiang-Fan area as a mobile reserve] 
 38th Division – Li Chiu-sze
 180th Division – Liu Chen-shan

Sources 

[1] Hsu Long-hsuen and Chang Ming-kai, History of The Sino-Japanese War (1937–1945) 2nd Ed., 1971. Translated by Wen Ha-hsiung, Chung Wu Publishing; 33, 140th Lane, Tung-hwa Street, Taipei, Taiwan Republic of China.
Pg. 339–342.
Map 22.

[3]  Post subject: Re: Central Hopei Operation November 25–30, 1940  Correct names for the Japanese commanders

From: Senshi Sōshō

11th Army – Lt. General Waichiro Sonobe 
– Kayashima Force – Lt. Gen Takashi Kayashima 1939–1941 at  Tang-yang—18th Independent Mixed Brigade – Lt. Gen Takashi Kayashima 1939– 1941—40th Division – Lt-General Naojiro Amaya,  
– Murakami Force – Lt. Gen Keisaku Murakami  at  Chingmen—39th Division – Lt. Gen Keisaku Murakami  
-Teshima Force – Lt. General Fusataro Teshima [at Sui Hsien/Suizhou] 
– 3rd Division – Fusataro Teshima

[4] Generals from Japan
http://www.generals.dk/nation/Japan.html

[5] The Japanese Mutumi troop encyclopedia
https://web.archive.org/web/20100516180653/http://homepage1.nifty.com/kitabatake/rikukaiguntop.html

Central Hubei
Central Hubei